The following is a list of episodes from the Showtime original television series United States of Tara, created by Academy Award–winning screenwriter Diablo Cody and executive produced by Steven Spielberg. The series premiered on January 18, 2009 and aired its thirty-sixth and final episode on June 20, 2011.

Series overview

Episodes

Season 1 (2009)

Season 2 (2010)

Season 3 (2011)

References

External links
 Official United States of Tara Website
 United States of Tara at the Internet Movie Database

Lists of American comedy-drama television series episodes
Lists of American LGBT-related television series episodes